The Australian Technology Network (ATN) is a network of six Australian universities, with a strong history of innovation, enterprise and working closely with industry. ATN traces its origins back to 1975 as the Directors of Central Institutes of Technology (DOCIT), and was revived in 1999 in its present form with major changes to its membership announced in 2018 and 2020.

ATN is the second largest university grouping in Australia, in terms of student number and research funding.

History

The ATN originated in 1975 as the "Directors of Central Institutes of Technology (DOCIT)", a conference group consisting of the directors of Australia's leading "institutes of technology". Each of DOCIT's original member institutions (NSWIT, QIT, RMIT, SAIT and WAIT) were located in the central business district of their respective state's capital city, hence they were deemed "central institutes of technology".

DOCIT founded its original member institutes' distinctiveness on their size (they enrolled almost one third of all full-time advanced education students), on the advanced level of their teaching (most of their programs were degrees rather than the diplomas like that of other advanced education institutions) and their conduct of applied research (DEET, 1993:18). They were therefore like a "technology-focused" group.

DOCIT encountered too much opposition to its aspirations, and disbanded in 1982. The conference group was later revived in 1999 as the Australian Technology Network, consisting of: the Curtin University of Technology, Queensland University of Technology, Royal Melbourne Institute of Technology, University of South Australia and University of Technology Sydney. Each ATN member university was granted public university status between 1986 and 1992, however their antecedents make them some of the oldest tertiary institutions in Australia.

QUT departed ATN on 28 September 2018.

Deakin University was announced as a new ATN member on 8 December 2020, bringing the Network's membership back up to five universities and making the network Australia's second largest university grouping in terms of student numbers and research funding. Deakin's membership bolsters ATN's geographic footprint with a presence in the regional gateway city of Geelong and regional Victoria.

On November 2021, the University of Newcastle joined the Australian Technology Network as an Associate Member, becoming the sixth member of the network.

Members

See also
List of universities in Australia
Group of Eight
Innovative Research Universities Australia
Regional Universities Network
Association of American Universities
C9 League
Russell Group
National Institutes of Technology
TU9
U15 Group of Canadian Research Universities

Notes

References

External links
 Australian Technology Network Homepage

 
College and university associations and consortia in Australia
Curtin University
RMIT University
University of South Australia
University of Technology Sydney